George McCulloch (February 22, 1792 – April 6, 1861) was an American politician who served as a Democratic member of the U.S. House of Representatives from Pennsylvania.

George McCulloch was born in Maysville, Kentucky.  Upon the death of his parents, he was sent to Cumberland County, Pennsylvania, where he was reared by relatives.  He became an ironmaster, with extensive iron interests in Centre County, Pennsylvania.  He was a member of the Pennsylvania State Senate for the 17th district from 1835 to 1836.  He was one of the proprietors of Hannah Furnace from 1836 to 1850.

McCulloch was elected as a Democrat to the Twenty-sixth Congress to fill the vacancy caused by the death of William W. Potter.  He was an unsuccessful candidate for election in 1842.  He retired from political life and active business pursuits with residence in Lewistown, Pennsylvania.  He died in Port Royal, Pennsylvania.  Interment in Church Hill Cemetery, southwest of Port Royal, Pennsylvania.

Footnotes

Sources

The Political Graveyard

|-

1792 births
1861 deaths
19th-century American politicians
Burials in Pennsylvania
Democratic Party members of the United States House of Representatives from Pennsylvania
American ironmasters
Democratic Party Pennsylvania state senators
People from Maysville, Kentucky